Massachusetts House of Representatives' 36th Middlesex district in the United States is one of 160 legislative districts included in the lower house of the Massachusetts General Court. It covers Dracut and Tyngsborough in Middlesex County. Since 2003, Colleen M. Garry of the Democratic Party has represented the district.

The current district geographic boundary overlaps with those of the Massachusetts Senate's 2nd Essex and Middlesex district and 1st Middlesex district.

Representatives

 Fred Cain
 John McNeil
 James V. DiPaola
 Christopher G. Fallon
 Colleen M. Garry, 2003-current

See also
 List of Massachusetts House of Representatives elections
 List of Massachusetts General Courts
 Other Middlesex County districts of the Massachusetts House of Representatives: 1st, 2nd, 3rd, 4th, 5th, 6th, 7th, 8th, 9th, 10th, 11th, 12th, 13th, 14th, 15th, 16th, 17th, 18th, 19th, 20th, 21st, 22nd, 23rd, 24th, 25th, 26th, 27th, 28th, 29th, 30th, 31st, 32nd, 33rd, 34th, 35th, 37th
 List of former districts of the Massachusetts House of Representatives

Images
Portraits of legislators

References

External links
 Ballotpedia
  (State House district information based on U.S. Census Bureau's American Community Survey).

House
Government of Middlesex County, Massachusetts